I Killed Wild Bill Hickok is a 1956 American Western film directed by Richard Talmadge. It is an entirely fictional account of Wild Bill Hickok (Tom Brown) who is the villain of the film.  The film was produced and written by Johnny Carpenter who also stars and narrates under the name John Forbes.  The film is the second of two films produced by The Wheeler Company.

Plot

Cast 
Johnny Carpenter as 'Johnny Rebel' Savage
Denver Pyle as Jim Bailey
Virginia Gibson as Anne James
Tom Brown as Sheriff Wild Bill Hickok
Helen Westcott as Bella Longtree
I. Stanford Jolley as Henry Longtree
Frank 'Red' Carpenter as Ring Pardo
Roy Canada as Nato, the Indian
Harvey B. Dunn as Dr. Reed
Lee Sheldon as Kate Savage
Phil Barton as Pancho, chief thug
William Mims as Dan Bevins, a rancher
R.J. Thomas as Tommy, the blacksmith
Bill Chaney as Tex, a cowpoke

Notes

External links 

1956 films
1956 Western (genre) films
American Western (genre) films
Cultural depictions of Wild Bill Hickok
1950s English-language films
1950s American films